East Jewett Range is a mountain in Greene County, New York. It is located in the Catskill Mountains west-southwest of Maplecrest. Van Loan Hill is located north, and Onteora Mountain is located east-southeast of East Jewett Range.

References

Mountains of Greene County, New York
Mountains of New York (state)